Corral de Almaguer is a Spanish municipality of Toledo province, in the autonomous community of Castile-La Mancha. Its population is 5,549 and its surface is 329 km², with a density of 16.9 people/km².

The mayor of Corral de Almaguer is Juliana Fernández de la Cueva Lominchar of the ruling Partido Popular.

In the 2004 Spanish General Election the Partido Popular got 56.0% of the vote in Corral de Almaguer, the Partido Socialista Obrero got 39.1% and Izquierda Unida got 2.8%.

References

Municipalities in the Province of Toledo